Kolkhozny (masculine), Kolkhoznaya (feminine), or Kolkhoznoye (neuter) may refer to:
Kolkhozny, Republic of Adygea, a village (khutor) in the Republic of Adygea, Russia
Kolkhozny, Ulyanovsk Oblast, a settlement in Ulyanovsk Oblast, Russia